Vyacheslav Viktorovich Volodin (born 4 February 1964) is a Russian politician who currently serves as the 10th Chairman of the State Duma (since 5 October 2016).

He is a former aide to President Vladimir Putin. The former Secretary-General of the United Russia party, he was a deputy in the State Duma from 1999 until 2011 and from 2016 to present day. From 2010 until 2012, he was Deputy Prime Minister of Russia. He is also a former first deputy Chief of Staff of the Presidential Administration of Russia. Volodin engineered Putin's conservative turn in his third term. He is part of Putin's inner circle.

Early life and education 
Volodin was born 4 February 1964 in the village of Alexeyevka, Khvalynsky District, Saratov Oblast, in a large family. His father was the captain of the river fleet; he died at the age of 51 in 1969. After the death of his father, he was brought up by his stepfather. His sister is an employee of a consulting firm, and his brother is a military pensioner. All of them, according to Volodin himself, live in the Saratov Oblast. His mother graduated from the Saratov Pedagogical College. After completing her studies, she refused a job assignment to Leningrad and remained in her native region, because she did not want to leave her elderly mother alone. She worked as a primary school teacher in a rural school.

Volodin graduated in mechanical engineering from the Faculty of organization and technology of the Saratov Institute of Mechanization of Agriculture in 1986, and then in law from the Russian State Service Academy under the President of the Russian Federation in 1995. He obtained a Ph.D. in law from the Interior Ministry's St. Petersburg Institute in 1996 with a thesis entitled, "A Russian Constituent Entity: Problems of Power, Law-making and Administration." He worked as a lecturer and assistant professor while he studied in Petersburg.

Political career

in regional politics
In 1990, he was elected as a member of the Saratov City Duma. Since 1992, Volodin was the Deputy of the Head of Administration of Saratov, since 1994 deputy chairman of the Saratov Oblast Duma and in 1996 he was appointed to the Vice Governor of the Saratov region.

Deputy Chairman of the Duma (1999-2010)
In the Russian legislative election in 1999, he was a candidate of the political bloc Fatherland – All Russia. After being elected Volodin became deputy chairman of the third State Duma, and from September 2001 he was the head of the Fatherland – All Russia.

In 2003, he ran for a seat in the fourth State Duma and was elected as a Deputy from the Balakovo constituency, Saratov Oblast. In the fourth State Duma he was deputy chairman again and appointed first deputy head of the fraction of the ruling party United Russia which has been founded in 2001. Since 2005 he was the party's Secretary-General of its Council Presidium.

In 2007, he was elected to the Russian State Duma in its fifth session. Until October 2010, he was once more Deputy Chairman of the Duma.

Deputy Chairman of Government (2010-2012)
On 21 October 2010, he was appointed Deputy Prime Minister under Dmitry Medvedev. as well as—after the dismissal of Sergey Sobyanin in connection with his approval to the Mayor of Moscow—Chief of Staff of the Presidential Executive Office.

First deputy Chief of Staff of the Presidential Administration of Russia (2012-2016)

Father of spy software
Following the Snow Revolution protests against the outcomes of the 2011 Russian legislative election organized by several persons, including Alexei Navalny, who used Facebook, Twitter, and LiveJournal blogs to organize the events, Volodin, who was Deputy Prime Minister at the time and later became First Deputy Chief of Staff of the Presidential Administration of Russia and was responsible for domestic policy, was tasked with countering these efforts and began to rein in the internet using Prisma which "actively tracks the social media activities that result in increased social tension, disorderly conduct, protest sentiments and extremist" by monitoring in real time the protesters discussions on blogs and social networks and performs social media tracking which later led to the establishment of the Internet Research Agency.

On 28 April 2014, following the Crimean status referendum, the U.S. Treasury put Volodin on the Specially Designated Nationals List (SDN), a list of individuals sanctioned as "members of the Russian leadership's inner circle." The sanctions freeze any assets he holds in the US and ban him from entering the United States.

On 12 May 2014, Volodin was added to the European Union sanctions list due to his role in the 2014 Crimean crisis. He is barred from entering countries in the EU, and his assets in the EU have been frozen.

Despite the fact that Volodin actively supports Vladimir Putin (for example, he says that "no Putin, no Russia"), many experts talk about his presidential ambitions. So in 2012, one of his friends in an interview with Reuters said that considers Volodin the future President, as "he has a desire to fly high". Another close to Volodin man said: "an ordinary person in the afternoon thinking about plans for the evening. Volodin does not think about plans for the evening—he has a plan for life. When he was Vice Mayor of Saratov, he already said to friends that he would become President of Russia." In addition, in 2015, the cleric Vsevolod Chaplin, commenting on the article in the Izvestia about the personal life of a number of political figures of Russia, also spoke about the presidential ambitions of Volodin.

Chairman of the State Duma

Elections

2016
For the first time rumors that Volodin could become the new Chairman of the State Duma after the 2016 legislative election appeared before the election. However, this information has not been confirmed.

After the 2016 legislative election, the previous Chairman of the State Duma Sergey Naryshkin was appointed Director of the Foreign Intelligence Service. On 23 September 2016, President Vladimir Putin proposed to the United Russia to nominate Vyacheslav Volodin to the post of Chairman of the State Duma. The majority leader Vladimir Vasilyev said that the United Russia faction will support the candidacy of Volodin. Candidacy Volodin also supported the faction of the Liberal Democratic Party and A Just Russia. On 5 October, Vyacheslav Volodin was elected Chairman of the State Duma, received 404 votes. His only rival was the communist Dmitry Novikov, who received 40 votes.

2021
In 2021, Volodin was again nominated to the chairmanship of the 8th State Duma. His candidacy was again endorsed by the Liberal Democratic Party and A Just Russia — For Truth. The only opponent of Volodin was again the candidate from the Communist Party Dmitry Novikov. On 12 October, Vyacheslav Volodin was re–elected Chairman of the State Duma, received 360 votes.

Tenure

In October 2016, he was among the three most influential politicians in Russia (after presidents Vladimir Putin and Dmitry Medvedev) by rating of the Center for Political Technologies. According to a survey conducted by the expert-analytical center of RANEPA, the level of recognition of Vyacheslav Volodin is at a high level. 83% of respondents know that he holds the post of Chairman of the State Duma. In addition, 78% of Russians have a positive or neutral view of Volodin's activities as Chairman of the State Duma.

On 24 November 2016, he was elected Chairman of the Parliamentary Assembly of the Collective Security Treaty Organization and on 26 December 2016 he was elected Chairman of the Parliamentary Assembly of the Union State.

As Chairman, Volodin actively began to deal with the discipline of deputies. At first he forbade deputies to vote by proxy for other deputies. In this connection, the deputies have to attend the meetings in person. Fines for missing meetings without a valid reason were also introduced.

On 6 March 2019, Vyacheslav Volodin, during a meeting of the State Duma, interrupted the report of the Minister of Economic Development Maxim Oreshkin and did not allow him to finish his speech. Volodin accused him of being unprepared and offered to report again in a month (usually such reports pass only once a year). According to some deputies, this case is the first in the entire post-Soviet history of Russia.

On 6 April 2019, Volodin proposed amendments to the Constitution allowing the State Duma to participate more actively in the formation of the government. According to him, the State Duma should at least participate in consultations when appointing members of the government (currently, the participation of the State Duma in the formation of the government is limited only by the fact that it must give consent to the President to appoint the Prime Minister). Volodin said that the participation of the State Duma in the formation of the government "would be consistent with the principles of proper balance of power" and "would provide a higher level of responsibility" in the work of Ministers. In July 2019, Volodin again called for the introduction of appropriate amendments to the Constitution in his article in the Parliamentary Newspaper. Later, Volodin's proposal was supported by the leaders of all opposition parliamentary parties. In January 2020, Putin proposed introducing such amendments during his Address to the Federal Assembly.

In November 2019, Volodin said that due to Ukrainian nationalism and an alleged oppression of ethnic minorities, there was a chance that some regions (oblasts) may separate from Ukraine.

On 24 February 2022, Volodin said that "the purpose" of the Russian invasion of Ukraine is "to protect people living in Ukraine". He wrote on his Telegram that "demilitarizing Ukraine" is the "only path that will allow us to prevent war in Europe. Our only chance to stop the fighting and the humanitarian catastrophe." According to Meduza, he was one of the first Russian politicians to publicly support the invasion. He has denounced Russians who oppose the war as "traitors". On 5 April 2022, Volodin claimed that the massacre in the Ukrainian city of Bucha is a staged "provocation" by the West and Ukraine "aimed at discrediting Russia".

On 6 July 2022, Volodin warned that Russia could demand back the US state of Alaska, which was sold by Russia to the United States in 1867, if the United States continued to seize Russian assets abroad.

Russian citizens critical of the 2022 Russian mobilization have used social media and other electronic means (e.g. Twitter) to enquire en masse Russia's top officials and deputies, who supported war with Ukraine and mobilization, whether they themselves or their sons would go to the front. Most of them refused to answer or made excuses why it was not possible for them to go to war in Ukraine. Volodin said that the State Duma will support deputies who want to enlist in the army and go to Ukraine.

Volodin has controversially claimed that "Ukraine has lost the ability to exist as a state”, “Ukraine is occupied by NATO” and “[Ukraine] has become a colony of the US”.

2017 rumours of Volodin as president

On 20 April 2017, at the meeting of the organizing committee for the Victory Day, which was held by President Vladimir Putin, the head of the Organization of Veterans of the War in Afghanistan Andrey Chepurnoy spoke. He criticized Senator Franz Klintsevich, Chairman of the Russian Union of Veterans of Afghanistan. He spoke about the letter of Klintsevich, in which he indicates Volodin as the next President. Commenting on this speech, Putin said that "the successor to the President is determined only by the Russian people in the democratic elections—and no one else". Later Klintsevich denied the words of Chepurnoy and called it slander. At the same time, one of the members of the Moscow organization "Safe Capital" said that Klintsevich really mentioned the presidential ambitions of Volodin. "At one of the meetings in 2016 with our organization Klintsevich said that it is necessary to support Volodin in all his endeavors, because he, according to Klintsevich, will be the next President of Russia". According to political scientist Stanislav Belkovsky, Volodin has presidential ambitions, but he is not going to be President "instead of Putin", and will agree to become president only if Putin offers him.

Honours and awards (selection) 

 Order of Friendship (1997)
 Order of Honour (2003)
 Order "For Merit to the Fatherland" 4th class (2006); 2nd class (2012)

Family life
Volodin has a daughter and two sons.

References

External links 
 
 Archived versions of Volodins former homepage (edited until 2010, Russian)
 Official biography at kremlin.ru
 Detailed biographic article by Alexey Makarkin (Russian)

Aides to the President of Russia
United Russia politicians
Russian nationalists
Russian conspiracy theorists
Recipients of the Order "For Merit to the Fatherland", 2nd class
Recipients of the Order of Honour (Russia)
People from Saratov Oblast
1964 births
Living people
21st-century Russian politicians
1st class Active State Councillors of the Russian Federation
Chairmen of the State Duma
Saratov State Agrarian University alumni
Scholars of constitutional law
Anti-Ukrainian sentiment in Russia
Third convocation members of the State Duma (Russian Federation)
Fourth convocation members of the State Duma (Russian Federation)
Fifth convocation members of the State Duma (Russian Federation)
Seventh convocation members of the State Duma (Russian Federation)
Eighth convocation members of the State Duma (Russian Federation)
Russian individuals subject to the U.S. Department of the Treasury sanctions
Russian individuals subject to European Union sanctions